Hvíti Riddarinn (English: The White Knight) is a multi-sport club based in Mosfellsbær, Iceland. It was founded on 14 August 1998 and through its history has fielded departments in football, handball and basketball.

Football

Men's football
The club has fielded a men's football team since 2001. It has played in the Icelandic football tournament since 2005.

Notable coaches
John Andrews
Guðmundur Viðar Mete

Women's football
In 2015, the club fielded a women's football team for the first time when it participated in the Icelandic second-tier 1. deild kvenna.

References

External links
Hvíti Riddarinn at Football Association of Iceland

1998 establishments in Iceland
Association football clubs established in 1998
Basketball teams established in 2005
Basketball teams in Iceland
Football clubs in Iceland
Handball teams in Iceland